Daniel Rupf (born 25 April 1967) is a retired Swiss football defender.

While at FC Aarau he was part of the side that won the Swiss national title in 1992–93.

References

1967 births
Living people
Swiss men's footballers
FC Wettingen players
FC Aarau players
FC Winterthur players
Association football defenders
Swiss Super League players